Christopher I. Beckwith (born October 23, 1945) is an American philologist and distinguished professor in the Department of Central Eurasian Studies at Indiana University in Bloomington, Indiana.

He has a B.A. in Chinese from Ohio State University (1968), an M.A. in Tibetan from Indiana University (1974) and a Ph.D. in Inner Asian Studies from Indiana University (1977).

Beckwith, a MacArthur Fellow, is a researcher in the field of Central Eurasian studies. He researches the history and cultures of ancient and medieval Central Asia. Concomitantly he specializes in Asian language studies and linguistics, and in the history of Central Eurasia. He teaches Old Tibetan, Central Eurasian languages, and Central Eurasian history and researches the linguistics of Aramaic, Chinese, Japanese, Koguryo, Old Tibetan, Tokharian, Old Turkic, Uzbek, and other languages.

His best-known works include Greek Buddha: Pyrrho's Encounter with Early Buddhism in Central Asia and Empires of the Silk Road: A History of Central Eurasia from the Bronze Age to the Present. Greek Buddha examines links between very early Buddhism and the philosophy of Pyrrho, an ancient Greek philosopher who accompanied Alexander the Great on his Indian campaign. The book is noted for its challenging and iconoclastic approach to multiple issues in the development of early Buddhism, Pyrrhonism, Daoism, Jainism and the Śramaṇa movement. Empires of the Silk Road is a rethinking of the origins, history, and significance of Central Eurasia.

Publications
The Tibetan Empire in Central Asia (1987)
Medieval Tibeto-Burman Languages Vols I-III, editor (2002, 2006, 2008)
Koguryo, the Language of Japan's Continental Relatives (2004)
Phoronyms: Classifiers, Class Nouns, and the Pseudopartitive Construction (2007) 
Warriors of the Cloisters: The Central Asian Origins of Science in the Medieval World (2012)
Empires of the Silk Road: A History of Central Eurasia from the Bronze Age to the Present (2011) 
Greek Buddha: Pyrrho's Encounter with Early Buddhism in Central Asia (2015)
The Scythian Empire: Central Eurasia and the Birth of the Classical Age from Persia to China (2023)

References

External links

See also 
 Similarities between Pyrrhonism and Buddhism

MacArthur Fellows
Linguists from the United States
Tibetologists
Turkologists
Indo-Europeanists
1945 births
Living people
Indiana University alumni
Indiana University faculty
Ohio State University College of Arts and Sciences alumni
Paleolinguists
Linguists of Puyŏ languages
Buddhism in Indiana
Scholars of ancient Greek philosophy